Bishop Stuart University (BSU) is a private, not-for-profit, multi-campus university in Uganda.

Location
 The coordinates of the main campus of the university are 0°36'10.0"S, 30°41'44.0"E (Latitude:-0.602778, Longitude:30.695556). The second campus is located at Ruharo Hill, also in the Mbarara Metropolitan Area.

History
BSU is named after Cyril Stuart who was the Anglican Bishop of Uganda in the middle of the 20th Century. BSU started operations in 2003 at the campus of then Kakoba National Teacher's College (KNTC) in the western Ugandan city of Mbarara. KNTC ceased operations at the end of 2005, and in 2006, BSU took over the premises and grounds previously occupied by the teachers' college. In 2006, BSU held its maiden graduation ceremony. However, the certificates, diplomas, and degrees were awarded by Uganda Christian University. The first batch of students to graduate on BSU letterheads were the graduates of 2009. On 10 October 2014, at the university's 10th graduation ceremony, Minister of Education Jessica Alupo announced that BSU had been cleared by the Uganda National Council for Higher Education to receive a university charter. The charter was granted and delivered to the university in late October 2014.

Academic affairs
, BSU had the following academic faculties and departments:

Faculty of Agriculture, Environmental Sciences and Technology
 
 Department of Agriculture

Faculty of Business, Economics & Governance
 Department of Social Work & Social Administration
 Department of Business Studies
 Department of Development Studies
 Department of Environmental Studies
 Department of Economics & Management

Faculty of Education, Arts & Media Studies
 Department of Education Foundations
 Department of Humanities
 Department of Languages
 Department of Science Education

Faculty of Law
 Department of Law

Academic courses
The university offers courses at certificate, diploma, undergraduate, and postgraduate levels. The programs offered include:

Certificate/Short courses

1. Certificate in Computerized Accounting

2. Certificate in NGO Management

3. Certificate in Monitoring and Evaluation

4. Certificate in Project Planning and Management 

5. Certificate in Research and Usage of Research Software

6. Certificate in Computer Applications

7. Certificate in Oil and Gas Management Essentials

8. Certificate in Community-Based Rehabilitation

9. Certificate in Human Resource Management 

10. Certificate in Public Administration and Management

11. Certificate in Information Technology Essentials

12. Certificate in Graphic Design

13. Certificate in Website Design and Development

14. Certificate in Network Maintenance

15. Cisco Certified Network Associate

16. Certificate in Administrative Law

17. Advanced Certificate in Appropriate and Sustainable Technologies

Diploma courses
1. Diploma in Computer Science

2. Diploma in Midwifery Extension

3. Diploma in Nursing Science

4. Diploma in Nursing Extension

5. Diploma in Public Health

6. Diploma in Agribusiness Management and Community Development

7. Diploma in Information Technology

8. Diploma in Animal Health And Production

9. Diploma in Law

10. Diploma in Ethics and Human Rights

11. Diploma in Primary Education

12. Diploma in Industrial Fine Art Design

13. Diploma in Science and Technology Education

14. Diploma in Early Childhood Education

15. Diploma in Journalism and Mass Communication

16. Diploma in Library and Information Science

17. Diploma in Office Management and Secretarial Studies

18. Diploma in Procurement and Supply Chain Management

19. Diploma in Records Management and Information Science

20. Diploma in Social Work and Social Administration

21. Diploma in Project Planning and Management

22. Diploma in Public Administration and Management

23. Diploma in Development Studies

24. Diploma in Accounting and Finance

25. Diploma in Microfinance & Business Enterprise Management

26. Diploma in Human Resource Management

27. Diploma in Business Administration

28. Diploma in Community Psychology

29. Diploma in Guidance and Counseling.

Undergraduate courses

1. Bachelor of Science in Agricultural Economics and Resource Management

2. Bachelor of Public Health

3. Bachelor of Nursing Science

4. Bachelor of Animal Health and Production

5. Bachelor of Computer Science

6. Bachelor of Agribusiness Management and Community Development

7. Bachelor of Sports Science

8. Bachelor of Information Technology

9. Bachelor of Agriculture and Community Development

10. Bachelor of Laws

11. Bachelor of Arts in Ethics And Human Rights

12. Bachelor of Arts in Theology

13. Bachelor in Industrial Fine Art Design

14. Bachelor of Arts with Education

15. Bachelor of Primary Education 

16. Bachelor of Secondary Education

17. Bachelor of Arts in Performing and Leisure Arts

18. Bachelor of Science and Technology Education

19. Bachelor of Science with Education

20. Bachelor of Arts in Development Management

21. Bachelor of Arts in Development Economics

22. Bachelor of Arts in Journalism and Mass Communication

23. Bachelor of Business Administration

24. Bachelor of Guidance and Counseling

25. Bachelor of Conservation & Natural Resources Environmental Management

26. Bachelor of Community Psychology

27. Bachelor of Library and Information Science

28. Bachelor of Office Management and Secretarial Studies

28. Bachelor of  Planning and Community Development

29. Bachelor of Science in Economics and Statistics

30. Bachelor of Procurement and Supply Chain Management

31. Bachelor of Project Planning and Management

32. Bachelor of Records Management and Information Science

33. Bachelor of Science in Accounting & Finance

34. Bachelor of Microfinance & Business Enterprise Management

35. Bachelor of Social Work and Social Administration

36. Bachelor of Development Studies

38. Bachelor of Science in Environmental Sciences

39. Bachelor of Public Administration and Management

40. Bachelor of Human Resource Management

41. Bachelor of Tourism and Hospitality Management

42. Bachelor of Economics and Management

43. Bachelor of Cooperative Management and Development.

Post Graduate, Masters and PhD courses 

1. Doctor of Philosophy in Agriculture and Community Innovations

2. Master of Science in Climatic Change and Food Security

3. Master of Business Information Technology

4. Master of Public Health

5. Master of Agriculture and Rural Innovations

6. Master of Science in Agronomy (Dry Land Farming)

7. Postgraduate Diploma in Agriculture And Rural Innovations

8. Doctor of Philosophy in Language, Culture, and Society

9. Master of Arts in Literature and Communication

10. Master of Education in Administration and Planning

11. Postgraduate Diploma in Education

12. Postgraduate Diploma in Education Management

13. Doctor of Philosophy in Development Studies

14. PhD in Development Management

15. Master of Science in Counseling Psychology

16. Master of Social Work

17. Master of Social Economics and Community Management

18. Master of Business Administration

19. Master of Arts in Development Studies

20. Master of Arts in Public Administration and Management

21. Postgraduate Diploma in Counseling

22. Postgraduate Diploma in Development Studies

23. Postgraduate Diploma in Public Administration and Management

24. Postgraduate Diploma on Office Management and Secretarial Studies.

See also
 Education in Uganda
 List of universities in Uganda
 List of university leaders in Uganda
 Mbarara

Notable alumni
Robert Mugabe Kakyebezi

References

External links
 Bishop Stuart University Homepage

 
Mbarara
Mbarara District
Ankole sub-region
Educational institutions established in 2002
2002 establishments in Uganda